Nic Hill is an American film director. He has directed films including Truth in Numbers?, Tokyo to Osaka, and Piece by Piece.

Filmography

References

External links

Living people
1981 births
People from San Diego
Film directors from California